Alice Loveridge (born 6 July 1994) is a former table tennis player from Guernsey who competes in international level events. She has represented Great Britain at the 2010 Summer Youth Olympics and Guernsey at the 2014 Commonwealth Games but did not medal either tournament. She has also competed at the Island Games winning nine medals.

References

External links
 

1994 births
Living people
Guernsey sportswomen
Sportspeople from Nottingham
British female table tennis players
Table tennis players at the 2010 Summer Youth Olympics
Table tennis players at the 2014 Commonwealth Games
Commonwealth Games competitors for Guernsey